Zorzines is a monotypic moth genus of the family Noctuidae. Its only species, Zorzines plumula, is found in Panama. Both the genus and the species were first described by Herbert Druce in 1891.

References

Herminiinae
Monotypic moth genera